Estudiantes Tecnológico de Nuevo Laredo is a football (soccer) club from Nuevo Laredo, Tamaulipas, Mexico. They play in the Tercera División de México of the Federación Mexicana de Fútbol Asociación. The team plays its home matches in Estadio Olimpico del Tecnologico of Nuevo Laredo. The team is owned by the university Tecnológico de Nuevo Laredo.

External links
 Tercera Division Official Website

Defunct football clubs in Tamaulipas
Association football clubs established in 2010
2010 establishments in Mexico